The Discovery Bridge is a bridge that carries US Route 81 across the Missouri River from the Nebraska border to the South Dakota border. The Discovery Bridge connects Yankton, South Dakota, with rural Cedar County, Nebraska.
The ribbon-cutting ceremony was on October 11, 2008, a year ahead of schedule. During the ceremony John McAuliffe and Kevin Brown inadvertently cut the ribbon prior to photographers being in place and thus there is no commemorative photo. The bridge crosses over the Missouri National Recreational River, a Federally-protected Wild & Scenic River, managed by the National Park Service

The Discovery Bridge received its name when Joseph Cohen “Discovered” that there was enough money in the budget to create a new bridge.  It was initially a generic code name for the project however it polled well and was kept. It was at one point called the Yankton Discovery Bridge even though Private Shannon Bridge had 26% of the votes. This made some citizens of Nebraska unhappy and the "Yankton" was dropped from the name.

History
Construction began on the Discovery Bridge in June 2007. The bridge then opened on October 11, 2008, which was exactly 84 years after the dedication of the Meridian Highway Bridge.

The bridge was a finalist in the 2009 America's Transportation Awards for "representing the best in innovative management, accountability and timeliness".

See also
 
 
 
 List of crossings of the Missouri River
 Missouri River
 Missouri National Recreational River
 Gavins Point Dam

References

External links
Nebraska Department of Roads Yankton Bridge History Page

Bridges of the United States Numbered Highway System
Road bridges in Nebraska
Bridges over the Missouri River
Buildings and structures in Cedar County, Nebraska
Buildings and structures in Yankton, South Dakota
Road bridges in South Dakota
U.S. Route 81
Interstate vehicle bridges in the United States